Völkermarkt District is an administrative district in the Austrian State of Carinthia.

Municipalities
Völkermarkt is divided into 13 municipalities, of which 2 are towns and 3 market towns.

Towns
Bleiburg (4,083) 
Aich, Bleiburg, Dobrowa, Draurain, Ebersdorf, Einersdorf, Grablach, Kömmel, Kömmelgupf, Loibach, Lokowitzen, Moos, Replach, Rinkenberg, Rinkolach, Ruttach, Schattenberg, Schilterndorf, St. Georgen, St. Margarethen, Weißenstein, Wiederndorf, Woroujach 
Völkermarkt (Slovene: Velikovec) (11,373) 
Admont, Aich, Arlsdorf, Attendorf, Bach, Berg ob Attendorf, Berg ob St. Martin, Bergstein, Bischofberg, Bösenort, Dobrowa, Drauhofen, Dullach I, Dullach II, Dürrenmoos, Frankenberg, Führholz, Gänsdorf, Gattersdorf, Gletschach, Greuth, Gurtschitschach, Hafendorf, Haimburg, Höhenbergen, Hungerrain, Kaltenbrunn, Klein St. Veit, Korb, Kremschitz, Krenobitsch, Kulm, Ladratschen, Lassein, Lasseinerbucht, Lippendorf, Mittertrixen, Neudenstein, Niederdorf, Niedertrixen, Niedertrixen, Obersielach, Obertrixen, Oschenitzen, Penk, Pörtschach, Rakollach, Rammersdorf, Rammersdorf, Ratschitschach, Reifnitz, Reisdorf, Ruhstatt, Ruppgegend, Salchendorf, Skoflitzen, St. Agnes, St. Georgen am Weinberg, St. Jakob, St. Lorenzen, St. Margarethen ob Töllerberg, St. Martin, St. Michael ob der Gurk, St. Peter am Wallersberg, St. Stefan, Steinkogel, Tainach, Tainacherfeld, Terpetzen, Töllerberg, Unarach, Unterbergen, Unterlinden, Völkermarkt, Waisenberg, Wandelitzen, Watzelsdorf, Weinberg, Wernzach, Winklern, Wurzen

Market Towns
Eberndorf (Slovene: Dobrla vas) (6,016) 
Buchbrunn, Buchhalm, Duell, Eberndorf, Edling, Gablern, Gösselsdorf, Graben, Hart, Hof, Homitzberg, Humtschach, Köcking, Kohldorf, Kühnsdorf, Loibegg, Mittlern, Mökriach, Oberburg, Pribelsdorf, Pudab, Seebach, St. Marxen, Unterbergen, Wasserhofen 
Eisenkappel-Vellach (Slovene: Železna Kapla-Bela) (2,710) 
Bad Eisenkappel, Blasnitzen, Ebriach, Koprein Petzen, Koprein Sonnseite, Leppen, Lobnig, Rechberg, Remschenig, Trögern, Unterort, Vellach, Weißenbach, Zauchen 
Griffen (Slovene: Grebinj) (3,677) 
Altenmarkt, Enzelsdorf, Erlach, Gariusch, Gletschach, Griffen, Griffnergemeinde, Großenegg, Grutschen, Haberberg, Haberberg, Kaunz, Kleindörfl, Klosterberg, Langegg, Lichtenwald, Limberg, Lind, Obere Gemeinde, Poppendorf, Pustritz, Rakounig, Rausch, Salzenberg, Schloßberg, St. Jakob, St. Kollmann, St. Leonhard an der Saualpe, Stift Griffen, Tschrietes, Untergrafenbach, Untergreutschach, Unterrain, Wallersberg, Wölfnitz, Wriesen

Municipalities
Diex (Slovene: Djekše) (863) 
Bösenort (Slovene: Hudi kraj), Diex, Grafenbach (Slovene: Kneža), Großenegg (Slovene: Tolsti Vrh), Haimburgerberg (Slovene: Vovbrske Gore), Michaelerberg (Slovene: Šmihelska Gora), Obergreutschach (Slovene: Zgornje Krčanje) 
Feistritz ob Bleiburg (Slovene: Bistrica pri Pliberku) (2,128) 
Dolintschitschach, Feistritz ob Bleiburg, Gonowetz, Gonowetz, Hinterlibitsch, Hof, Lettenstätten, Penk, Pirkdorf, Rischberg, Ruttach-Schmelz, St. Michael ob Bleiburg, Tscherberg, Unterlibitsch, Unterort, Winkel 
Gallizien (Slovene: Galicija) (1,825) 
Abriach, Abtei, Dolintschach, Drabunaschach, Enzelsdorf, Feld, Freibach, Gallizien, Glantschach, Goritschach, Krejanzach, Linsendorf, Möchling, Moos, Pirk, Pölzling, Robesch, Unterkrain, Vellach, Wildenstein 
Globasnitz (Slovene: Globasnica) (1,645) 
Globasnitz, Jaunstein, Kleindorf, Podrain, Slovenjach, St. Stefan, Traundorf, Tschepitschach, Unterbergen, Wackendorf 
Neuhaus (Slovene: Suha) (1,236) 
Bach-Potoce, Berg ob Leifling, Graditschach, Hart, Heiligenstadt, Illmitzen, Kogelnigberg, Leifling, Motschula, Neuhaus, Oberdorf, Pudlach, Schwabegg, Unterdorf, Wesnitzen, Wesnitzen 
Ruden (Slovene: Ruda) (1,600) 
Dobrowa, Eis, Grutschen, Kanaren, Kleindiex, Kraßnitz, Lippitzbach, Obermitterdorf, Ruden, St. Jakob, St. Martin, St. Nikolai, St. Radegund, Untermitterdorf, Unternberg, Unterrain, Weißeneggerberg, Wunderstätten 
Sankt Kanzian am Klopeiner See (Slovene: Škocijan) (4,297) 
Brenndorf, Duell, Grabelsdorf, Horzach I, Horzach II, Kleindorf I, Kleindorf II, Klopein, Lanzendorf, Lauchenholz, Littermoos, Mökriach, Nageltschach, Oberburg, Obersammelsdorf, Oberseidendorf, Peratschitzen, Piskertschach, Saager, Schreckendorf, Seelach, Seidendorf, Sertschach, Srejach, St. Kanzian am Klopeiner See, St. Lorenzen, St. Marxen, St. Primus, St. Veit im Jauntal, Stein im Jauntal, Steinerberg, Unterburg, Unternarrach, Untersammelsdorf, Vesielach, Wasserhofen, Weitendorf 
Sittersdorf (Slovene: Žitara vas) (2,122) 
Altendorf, Blasnitzenberg, Dullach, Goritschach, Hart, Homelitschach, Jerischach, Kleinzapfen, Kristendorf, Miklauzhof, Müllnern, Obernarrach, Pfannsdorf, Pogerschitzen, Polena, Proboj, Rain, Rückersdorf, Sagerberg, Sielach, Sittersdorf, Sonnegg, Tichoja, Weinberg, Wigasnitz, Winkel, Wrießnitz

(All population data comes from the 2001 census)

 
Districts of Carinthia (state)